Pelopidas Iliadis (born 26 August 1949) is a Greek sports shooter. He competed in two events at the 1984 Summer Olympics.

References

External links
 

1949 births
Living people
Greek male sport shooters
Olympic shooters of Greece
Shooters at the 1984 Summer Olympics
Sportspeople from Athens
20th-century Greek people